is a private junior college in Showa-ku, Nagoya, Aichi Prefecture, Japan, established in 1953. The predecessor of the school was founded in 1898, when Margaret Young (1855-1940), a missionary from Anglican Church of Canada, started a school for child care women.

External links
 Official website 

Educational institutions established in 1898
Private universities and colleges in Japan
Universities and colleges in Nagoya
Japanese junior colleges
1898 establishments in Japan